Lesmes Mutna Freire Monteiro (born 1985) is a Guinea Bissauan Jurist, rapper ,known for his human rights activism.<ref>{{Cite web|title=Figura da semana: LESMES LANÇA "AS ARMAS DE CACHEU EM 183 PÁGINAS|url=http://www.odemocratagb.com/?p=9795|website=O Democrata GB|access-date=2020-05-20}}</ref>

He was a member of the Vigilant Non-Compliant Citizen's Movement (MCCI).''

In April 2017, he was attacked by a group of strangers for the allegedly protests against President José Mário Vaz.

Monteiro has a law degree from the Faculty of Law of Bissau.

References 

Bissau-Guinean activists
1985 births
Living people
Bissau-Guinean musicians
People from Bissau